The Ganzhou Uyghur Kingdom, also referred to as the Hexi Uyghurs, was established in 894 around Ganzhou in modern Zhangye. The kingdom lasted from 894 to 1036; during that time, many of Ganzhou's residents converted to Buddhism.

The Hexi Corridor, located within modern Gansu, was traditionally a Chinese inroad into Central Asia. From the 9th to 11th centuries this area was shared between the Ganzhou Uyghurs and the Guiyi Circuit. By the early 11th century both the Uyghurs and Guiyi Circuit were conquered by the Tangut people of the Western Xia dynasty.

The Ganzhou Uyghur rulers were descended from the House of Yaglakar.

History

There was a pre-existing community of Uyghurs at Ganzhou by 840 at the very latest.

In 874, remnant forces of the Tibetan Empire known as the Wenmo, Han Chinese slave soldiers under the Tibetan Empire, in Ganzhou drove out the Uyghurs.

Around the years 881 and 882, Ganzhou slipped from the control of the Guiyi Circuit.

In 894 the Uyghurs led by Pangteqin (Huaijian Khagan) established the Ganzhou Uyghur Kingdom in Ganzhou.

In 902 the Ganzhou Uyghurs sent military aid to Emperor Zhaozong of Tang.

In 910 the Ganzhou Uyghurs attacked the Kingdom of Jinshan (Guiyi).

In 911 the Ganzhou Uyghurs attacked the Kingdom of Jinshan and forced them into an alliance as a lesser partner.

In 916 a Ganzhou Uyghur princess was married to Cao Yijin, governor of the Guiyi Circuit.

In 920 Huaijian Khagan became sickly.

In 924 Huaijian Khagan died and his sons Diyin and Renmei fought over the throne with Diyin coming out on top. They received a royal appointment from the Later Tang dynasty. The Khitans of the Liao dynasty offered to let the Ganzhou Uyghurs return to their former homeland on the Orkhon but they refused the offer.

In 925 Cao Yijin led an attack on the Ganzhou Uyghurs and defeated them.

In 926 Diyin died and Aduoyu succeeded him as Shunhua Khagan. Shunhua Khagan married Cao Yijin's daughter.

In 930 Cao Yijin visited the Ganzhou Uyghur court in Ganzhou.

In 933 Shunhua Khagan died and Jingqiong succeeded him.

In 961 the Ganzhou Uyghurs accepted the Song dynasty as suzerains.

In 975 Jingqiong died and Yeluohe Mili'e succeeded him.

In 983 Jingqiong died and Lusheng succeeded him.

In 1003 Lusheng died and Zhongshun Baode Khagan succeeded him. The Tanguts attacked the Ganzhou Uyghurs but were defeated.

In 1008 the Ganzhou Uyghurs and Tanguts engaged in combat and the Uyghurs emerged victorious. The Liao dynasty attacked the Ganzhou Uyghurs and defeated them.

In 1009 the Ganzhou Uyghurs captured Liangzhou.

In 1010 the Liao dynasty attacked the Ganzhou Uyghurs and defeated them.

In 1016 Zhongshun Baode Khagan died and Huaining Shunhua Khagan succeeded him.

In 1023 Huaining Shunhua Khagan died and Guizhong Baoshun Khagan succeeded him.

In 1026 the Ganzhou Uyghurs were defeated in battle by the Liao dynasty.

In 1028 the Ganhzhou Uyghurs were defeated by the Tanguts. Guizhong Baoshun Khagan died and Baoguo Khagan succeeded him.

In 1036 the Ganzhou Uyghur Kingdom was annexed by the Tanguts. After the destruction of their realm, the Ganzhou Uyghurs migrated and settled in Dunhuang (Shazhou) and Guazhou. The Guazhou Uyghurs surrendered to the Tanguts in 1030 and Shazhou surrendered in 1036. A record of a Huolasan Khan ruling in Shazhou in 1127 shows that the Uyghurs there retained some amount of autonomy in Western Xia. Another group that settled between Dunhuang and the Qaidam Basin came to be known as the Yellow Head Uyghurs. They practiced Buddhism and lived as pastoral nomads. In the 13th century they were called the Sali Uyghurs. Their descendants are today known as the Yugurs.

Religion
The Uyghurs of Ganzhou originally practiced Manichaeanism as their state religion but abandoned it for Buddhism at the end of the 10th century due to pressure from the Tanguts. Like the Tanguts, they sent Buddhist pilgrimages to Mount Wutai, but the real reason for the expeditions may have been to spy on the Liao dynasty. According to Hong Hao, a Song dynasty diplomat on his way to the Jurchen Jin dynasty, the Uyghurs of the Hexi Corridor still practiced Buddhism:

Modern era
The modern day descendants of the Ganzhou Uyghurs are known as the Yugur.

See also
Yugur
Turkic peoples
Timeline of the Turkic peoples (500–1300) 
List of Turkic dynasties and countries
Uyghur Khaganate
Qocho

References

Bibliography

 

Uyghur Khaganate
Former countries in Chinese history